The canton of Charenton-le-Pont is an administrative division of the Val-de-Marne department, Île-de-France region, northern France. Its borders were modified at the French canton reorganisation which came into effect in March 2015. Its seat is in Charenton-le-Pont.

It consists of the following communes:
Charenton-le-Pont
Joinville-le-Pont
Nogent-sur-Marne (partly)
Saint-Maurice

References

Cantons of Val-de-Marne